Yuri Floriani (born 25 December 1981) is an Italian steeplechase runner.

Biography
On 31 May 2012 at Golden Gala in Rome, he qualified for the Olympics with his personal best of 8'22"62, for his first Olympic appearance in London 2012.

He lives in Sicily, at Palermo with his wife Angela Rinicella, former middle-distance runner, and their daughter Noemi.

Achievements

National titles
5 wins in 3000 m steeplechase at the Italian Athletics Championships (2005, 2007, 2008, 2010, 2011)

Progression
3000 metres steeplechase

References

External links
 

1981 births
Sportspeople from Trento
Italian male steeplechase runners
Living people
Athletes (track and field) at the 2012 Summer Olympics
Athletes (track and field) at the 2016 Summer Olympics
Olympic athletes of Italy
World Athletics Championships athletes for Italy
Athletes (track and field) at the 2009 Mediterranean Games
Mediterranean Games competitors for Italy